Sergio Torales (born April 11, 1982 in Asunción, Paraguay) is a Paraguayan footballer currently playing for Racing de Córdoba of the Torneo Argentino A.

Teams
  Presidentes Hayes 2000-2003
  General Caballero 2004
  Sportivo Trinidense 2004-2007
  2 de Mayo 2008
  Sport Huancayo 2009
  Toros Neza 2010
  Sportivo Trinidense 2011
  Racing de Córdoba 2011–present

External links
 Profile at BDFA 
 

1982 births
Living people
Paraguayan footballers
Paraguayan expatriate footballers
General Caballero Sport Club footballers
Sportivo Trinidense footballers
2 de Mayo footballers
Sport Huancayo footballers
Racing de Córdoba footballers
Expatriate footballers in Argentina
Expatriate footballers in Mexico
Expatriate footballers in Peru
Club Presidente Hayes footballers
Toros Neza footballers

Association footballers not categorized by position